Castellino del Biferno is a comune (municipality) in the Province of Campobasso in the Italian region Molise, located about  northeast of Campobasso.

Castellino del Biferno borders the following municipalities: Campolieto, Lucito, Matrice, Morrone del Sannio, Petrella Tifernina.

References

External links
 Official website

Cities and towns in Molise